Interstate 155 (I-155) is an east–west auxiliary route of Interstate 55 (I-55) that runs through the Bootheel of Missouri and the northwestern corner of Tennessee. It begins south of Hayti, Missouri at I-55, passes eastward through Caruthersville, and crosses the Mississippi River on the Caruthersville Bridge into Tennessee. The route then proceeds to Dyersburg, Tennessee, where it terminates at U.S. Route 51 (US 51). I-155 is the only road that directly connects Missouri and Tennessee, and is concurrent with US 412 for its entire length.

Route description

Interstate 155 begins at a near-full cloverleaf interchange with I-55 in Pemiscot County, Missouri, on the edge of Hayti, where US 412 continues as a four-lane divided highway to the northwest. Initially traveling in a southeastward direction, the interstate passes through farmland in a sparsely populated rural area. A few miles later, the highway passes south of Caruthersville where it has an interchange first with a local road, and then with the southern terminus of Route 84 near the Caruthersville Memorial Airport. A few miles later, the highway shifts south-southeast before crossing the Mississippi River on the  Caruthersville Bridge into Dyer County, Tennessee. 

Upon crossing the river, I-155 veers east-southeast and reaches an interchange with State Route 181 (SR 181), which is part of the Great River Road. Passing through additional farmland, the interstate crosses the Obion River a few miles later and has an interchange with SR 182 a short distance beyond south of the Lenox community. The highway then ascends out of the Mississippi Alluvial Plain on to the Gulf Coastal Plain and enters a wooded area, where the Tennessee Welcome Center is located, before reaching Dyersburg a few miles later. Traveling along the northern fringes of the city in an eastward direction, the interstate has an interchange first with SR 78, which also provides access to Tiptonville. A few miles later, the interstate turns northeast, before reaching a trumpet interchange with US 51, where the I-155 designation ends, and US 412 splits off to the south towards Jackson. The route continues to the northeast as a controlled-access segment of US 51.

History

Interstate 155 has its origins in the early 1940s, when a bridge linking Missouri and Tennessee was proposed. At the time, the two states were two of the few remaining bordering states in the country which were not directly connected by road or rail. A committee was created by both state legislatures to study the possibility of constructing the bridge in 1949. The site was chosen by the commission on November 18, 1952, which was subsequently approved by the Army Corps of Engineers on August 20, 1953. 

After the passage of the Federal Aid Highway Act of 1956, which authorized the Interstate Highway System, officials in Missouri, Tennessee, Kentucky, and Illinois began an effort to improve connectivity between the four states, which included a westward extension of I-24 from its allocated terminus in Nashville to southern Illinois. Governors John M. Dalton of Missouri and Buford Ellington of Tennessee announced on January 30, 1962, a proposal for a new interstate highway between I-55 in Hayti and I-40 in Jackson, Tennessee, incorporating the bridge. On September 17, 1963, the governors of the four states met with President John F. Kennedy where they reached an agreement on the alignment for the I-24 extension and endorsed the routing for the Hayti-to-Jackson interstate highway. On August 18, 1964, the Bureau of Public Roads, the predecessor agency to the Federal Highway Administration, authorized an interstate highway between Hayti and Dyersburg, which was named I-155, as well as the I-24 extension. However, they did not give approval to the entire proposed route. 

Work on the Caruthersville Bridge began in March 1969 and was opened to traffic on December 1, 1976, in a ceremony by Missouri Governor Kit Bond and Tennessee Governor Ray Blanton. The last section of I-155, located between SR 182 and the eastern terminus with US 51/412, was completed in November 1979. US 412 was added to the route in 1982.

Exit list

References

External links

Kurumi's 3di Page: x55 3dis

55-1 Missouri-Tennessee
55-1
55-1
1 (Missouri-Tennessee)
Transportation in Pemiscot County, Missouri
Transportation in Dyer County, Tennessee